Eslamabad (also Romanized as Eslāmābād; also known as Eslāmābād-e Mīlās) is a village in Milas Rural District, in the Central District of Lordegan County, Chaharmahal and Bakhtiari Province, Iran. At the 2006 census, its population was 363, in 69 families.

References 

Populated places in Lordegan County